The 2005 Turkmenistan Higher League (Ýokary Liga) season was the thirteenth season of Turkmenistan's professional football league. Nine teams competed in 2005.

Results

References

Ýokary Liga seasons
Turk
Turk
1